Richard Shelton (b. Wolverhampton, UK) is a British film, TV and theatre actor and singer, who performed in ITV's Emmerdale. He portrayed Frank Sinatra in Rat Pack Confidential in London's West End, and performed in the movies House of Lies and in My Week with Marilyn. In 2016, he starred in a free Sinatra show in the basement of a pub in Edinburgh, called Sinatra and Me.

Theatre
Shelton's professional acting debut was playing Edmund Sweetenham in the UK tour of the Agatha Christie classic play “A Murder is Announced” produced by Bill Kenwright.

In 2002, Shelton’s portrayal of Frank Sinatra in Rat Pack Confidential based on the book by Sean Levy and adapted for stage by Paul Sirett the Nottingham Playhouse earned a ‘Best Actor in a Leading Role’ nomination by the Manchester Evening News Theatre Awards. Shelton wrote and starred in Sinatra and Me for 2 consecutive seasons at the Edinburgh Festival to critical acclaim.

In 2018 and 2019, Shelton wrote and starred in ‘Sinatra: RAW’ at the Edinburgh Festival. His performance earned a nomination for best male performance in a musical'' at The Offies 2020.

References

External links

Official website

21st-century English male actors
English male stage actors
Living people
Year of birth missing (living people)